"The Emptiest Arms in the World"  is a song written and performed by American country music artist Merle Haggard and The Strangers.  It was released in March 1973 as the second single from the album I Love Dixie Blues.  The song peaked at number three on the U.S. Billboard Hot Country Singles chart. It reached number twelve on the Canadian RPM Country Tracks.

Personnel
Merle Haggard– vocals, guitar

The Strangers:
Roy Nichols – lead guitar
Norman Hamlet – steel guitar, dobro
 Bobby Wayne – guitar
Dennis Hromek – bass, background vocals
Biff Adam – drums

Chart performance

References

1973 singles
1973 songs
Merle Haggard songs
Songs written by Merle Haggard
Song recordings produced by Ken Nelson (American record producer)
Capitol Records singles